Swat District is a district in the Malakand Division of Khyber Pakhtunkhwa, Pakistan. With a population of 2,309,570 per the 2017 national census, Swat is the 15th-largest district of Khyber Pakhtunkhwa province. 
Swat has lot of tourist attractions comprised below:

Lakes 
 Bashigram Lake
 Daral Lake
 Izmis Lake
 Katora Lake
 Kundol Lake
 Mahodand Lake
 Pari Lake (Paristan Lake)
 Saidgai Lake
 Saifullah Lake
 Jabba Zomalu Lake
 Mushroom Lake (Swat)
 Kharkhari Lake

Waterfalls 
 Jarogo Waterfall
 Shingrai Waterfall

Valleys  
 Bahrain, Pakistan
 Gabin Jabba
 Gabral Valley
 Kalam Valley
 Malam Jabba
 Mankyal
 Marghuzar
 Miandam
 Matiltan
 Usho (Ushu Forest)
 Utror

Monuments and landmarks 
 Swat Museum
 Malam Jabba ski resort
 White Palace (Marghazar)
 Mahmud Ghaznavi Mosque (Odigram)

Peaks 
 Falak Sar (Swat), Ushu Valley of Swat, Pakistan
 Dwa Saray Ghar, Mountain on boarder between Swat, Buner and Shangla District
 Elum Ghar, Elum Mountain, location on boarder between Swat and Buner

References

External links
 Tourist attractions in Swat District by 

Tourist attractions in Swat
Lists of tourist attractions in Pakistan
Lists of tourist attractions in Pakistan by city